Hummin' to Myself may refer to:

 Hummin' to Myself (Linda Ronstadt album), 2004
 Hummin' to Myself (Dave Van Ronk album), 1990